Erith is a locality on the northern Adelaide Plains in the Mid North of South Australia. It is on the road northwest from Owen towards Bowmans and Port Wakefield.

The Erith primary school opened in 1877 but has since closed sometime after 1949.

References

Mid North (South Australia)